"The Goodies Rule – O.K.?" is a special episode of the British comedy television series The Goodies.

As always, it was written by the Goodies, with songs and music by Bill Oddie. The costume designer for this episode was Dee Robson.

Plot
It is the early '60s and the Goodies are trying to make it big as pop stars. However, at every turn, their ideas are ripped off by acts who then go on to be much more successful than the Cricklewood trio—the Beatles, the Supremes and the Bachelors. Now in the mid-'70s the Goodies are despondent and living on Skid Row, they decide to get their own back by stealing the most famous characteristics of some of the most successful artists around—Elton John's glasses, the Bay City Rollers' trousers, Donny Osmond's teeth, etc.

They are so successful, the top 10 is packed wall to wall with Goodies singles. The trio play Wembley Stadium, although to avoid crowd trouble, the audience is made up entirely of police. Having saved the pop business single-handedly, the Goodies are awarded OBEs at a spectacularly waterlogged royal garden party. To distract the nation from the appalling state of the economy, the Goodies are employed to cheer up the nation and they oblige with an irritating song and dance craze called "The Bounce".

With the nation in chaos, a general election is called (featuring comedian Kenny Everett in a cameo as one of the candidates), but is won by a party advocating no enjoyment whatsoever, populated by shop window dummies. With entertainment now illegal, the Goodies become Robin Hood-style outlaws, travelling the nation giving impromptu variety shows and hanging out in "jokeeasies" where they plot to overthrow the government. However, it is not that easy—the entertainers have been banned for so long that they cannot remember their old routines. Finally, the Goodies manage to oust the dummies and the entertainers take power—but with their memories gone, Bill suggests another option—a puppet government.

Taking this literally, popular puppets Sooty and Sweep are now the Prime Minister and the Home Secretary, and the Houses of Parliament are now full of screeching hand puppets. With their government at risk from these stuffed pretenders, the Goodies sneak into the Prime Minister's residence, Chequers, to remonstrate with the puppets. However they are immediately attacked and pursued by various giant versions of famous puppets from television in the '50s, '60s and '70s. They are threatened by a  Andy Pandy, Teddy and Looby Loo; Tim eats up Ernie the Cookie Grouch (a hybrid mix of Ernie, Oscar the Grouch and Cookie Monster from Sesame Street); he and Graeme are challenged to a sword fight by Bill and Ben, the Flower Pot Men; and Bill is roughly beaten up by The Wombles (a sly nod to the chart rivalry between the Goodies and Mike Batt's Wombles singles).

Having vanquished their foes, the Goodies relax...but charging up behind them is a  Dougal, the dog from The Magic Roundabout. As Graeme tries to ride the mighty "beast" and Tim is run over by the thing, Bill grapples with an enormous Zebedee, from the same programme. The trio guide Dougal and Zebedee back to the country house, where they comprehensively destroy the building and the puppet government.

Having hidden down a handy manhole, the Goodies return following this coup to their woodland retreat and look on as the Conservative, Labour and Liberal parties agree to form a coalition government. All seems well until the camera pulls back and reveals that Margaret Thatcher, Harold Wilson and Jeremy Thorpe are actually puppets being worked by...the Goodies. They smirk knowingly.

However, the last laugh is on the trio—and we see Bill, Graeme and Tim being worked by strings held by director Jim Franklin.

Cultural references

Note
The segment with the  Dougal, from The Magic Roundabout, was filmed at Parnham House, Dorset.

DVD and VHS releases

This episode has been released on DVD.

References

 "The Goodies Rule OK" – Robert Ross, Carlton Books Ltd, Sydney, 2006
 "From Fringe to Flying Circus – 'Celebrating a Unique Generation of Comedy 1960-1980'" – Roger Wilmut, Eyre Methuen Ltd, 1980
 "The Goodies Episode Summaries" – Brett Allender
 "The Goodies – Fact File" – Matthew K. Sharp
 "TV Heaven" – Jim Sangster & Paul Condon, HarperCollinsPublishers, London, 2005

External links
 

The Goodies (series 5) episodes
1975 British television episodes
British television shows featuring puppetry